Virtual Desire is a 1995 American erotic thriller film directed by Jim Wynorski and starring Julie Strain.

Cast
 Mike Meyer as Brad
 Ross Hagen as Crank
 Julie Strain as Sascha
 Gail Harris as Wendy

Production
According to Fred Olen Ray, Jim Wynorski left the film before it was completed in order to make The Wasp Woman. Ray said he would film footage of Ross Hagen for this movie and for Star Hunter at the same time. He said the films contain identical scenes involving the police.

References

External links
 

1995 films
Films directed by Jim Wynorski
American erotic thriller films
1990s erotic thriller films
1990s English-language films
1990s American films